Mária Holešová (born 24 April 1993) is a Slovak handballer who plays for Mosonmagyaróvári KC SE and the Slovakia national team.

Achievements  
Czech-Slovak Interliga:  
Winner: 2014, 2015, 2016, 2017

Slovak Pohár: 
Winner: 2014, 2015, 2016, 2017

Croatian First League:
Winner: 2019

References

1993 births
Living people
People from Bytča
Sportspeople from the Žilina Region
Slovak female handball players
RK Podravka Koprivnica players